Maurice Herbert Rindskopf (1917–2011) was the youngest officer to ascend to command of a Fleet Submarine in World War II; and until his death, was the last living World War II submarine commander.  His entire World War II submarine career was spent on board , where he was awarded a Silver Star as a lieutenant in charge of torpedoes and gunnery, and the Navy Cross as its commanding officer.  He culminated his career as a Rear Admiral and the Director of Naval Intelligence.

Early life and career
A native of Brooklyn, New York, Rindskopf graduated from the U.S. Naval Academy in 1938. He was assigned to the battleship  for two years. Rindskopf served on board Drum for eleven patrols and was awarded a Silver Star as a junior officer for torpedo and gunnery excellence. As a junior officer, he would often take the night watch and decode messages advising of targets. He would tell the crew of a target nearby by wearing "a garish yellow aloha shirt I had purchased in Honolulu, and lo! we went to Battle Stations."

He married Sylvia Lubow on April 16, 1941; their only child, civil rights lawyer Peter Rindskopf, was born on July 25, 1942.

Silver Star citation
The President of the United States of America takes pleasure in presenting the Silver Star to Lieutenant Maurice Herbert Rindskopf (NSN: 0-81027), United States Navy, for gallantry and intrepidity in combat during World War II. During four extensive War Patrols of the U.S.S. DRUM (SS-228) in enemy waters and despite determined enemy opposition he courageously and skillfully performed his duties as Torpedo and Gunnery Officer of a United States Submarine and thus assisted materially in the sinking of an important amount of Japanese shipping. His excellent judgment and coolness under fire contributed in a large measure to the success of the ship. His conduct throughout was in keeping with the highest traditions of the United States Naval Service.

Command of USS Drum
As second-in-command (Executive Officer) of Drum in June 1944, just prior to Drum's tenth patrol, the incumbent commanding officer developed gall stones.  Rindskopf wrote of it in an unpublished autobiography:

I was given two choices: To take command, or to break in yet another skipper. The decision was easy, and I became the first in the [U.S. Naval Academy] class of 1938 to command a fleet boat on patrol.

During his first patrol in command Rindskopf only came across targets too small for a torpedo.  He sank them by gunfire and brought the survivors aboard, putting them to work in the galley (kitchen).  They became Drum's cooks.

Drum did not sink another ship in World War II following Rindskopf's detachment.

Navy Cross Citation
The President of the United States of America takes pleasure in presenting the Navy Cross to Commander Maurice Herbert Rindskopf (NSN: 0-81027), United States Navy, for extraordinary heroism in the line of his profession as Commanding Officer of the U.S.S. DRUM (SS-228), on the ELEVENTH War Patrol of that submarine during the period 9 September 1944 to 8 November 1944, in enemy controlled waters of the Luzon Straits in the Philippine Islands. Through his daring, aggressive spirit and tenacity, Commander Rindskopf skillfully launched well-planned and smartly executed attacks which resulted in the sinking of enemy ships totaling over 24,000 tons and in damaging additional vessels totaling over 8,000 tons. Through his experience and sound judgment Commander Rindskopf brought his ship safely back to port. His conduct throughout was an inspiration to his officers and men and in keeping with the highest traditions of the United States Naval Service.

Summary of World War II

Post-war career
His command style was marked by the lack of his crew's practice of obscenity and profanity. "His stated position was that such language was simply evidence of mental deficiency on the part of the user, and the crew followed his example as long as he was in command." Later Rindkopf refined submarine fire control and tactics; commanded ; had command of the U.S. Naval Submarine School in Groton, CT; commanded two submarine flotillas; explored the use of hydrofoils in harbor defense; became the Director of Naval Intelligence; and Assistant Chief of Staff for Intelligence for the Commander in Chief, U.S. Pacific Fleet. Retiring from the Navy in 1972, Rindskopf worked for Westinghouse for 16 years.

Death
Rindskopf died of prostate cancer on July 27, 2011 at his home in Annapolis. His wife and son preceded him in death; he was survived by his granddaughter Amy Kathryn Rindskopf and two great-grandsons.

Several obituaries (e.g. The Annapolis Capital, Naval History Magazine) confused Rindskopf's eleven patrols onboard Drum as eleven patrols in command of Drum. He was only in command for patrols 10 and 11, yet he had a hand in every sinking in Drum's history.

Popular culture
Film and swim star

References

External links
Maurice H. Rindskopf Papers, 1934-1996 (bulk 1938-1970) MS 413 held by Special Collections & Archives, Nimitz Library at the United States Naval Academy

1917 births
2011 deaths
Jewish American military personnel
Deaths from prostate cancer
Pacific theatre of World War II
Recipients of the Navy Cross (United States)
Recipients of the Silver Star
Recipients of the Navy Distinguished Service Medal
Recipients of the Legion of Merit
United States Navy admirals
Directors of the Office of Naval Intelligence
21st-century American Jews